Who's Who in Black Canada is a non-profit website which researches and showcases profiles of prominent and successful Black Canadians past and present.

History
In 1999 Dawn Williams saw that there was an absence of Canadian publications showcasing examples of success and the contributions of prominent Canadians of African descent. She then spent the next three years researching and compiling content to produce a comprehensive snapshot of contributions of successful prominent African-Canadians, encompassing every province and territory in both of the country's official languages.

In 2002 she self-published the first edition of Who's Who in Black Canada, featuring 500-plus profiles. In 2004, she completed and published the second edition of the book Who's Who in Black Canada.

In June 2010 Williams was approached by the design & branding firm The Ricardo McRae Agency (www.ricardomcrae.com) about taking over her project and publishing  the profiles from the book online. After a series of discussions, they came to an agreement, and she transferred the ownership of the book content, and all digital rights to the agency.

On August 1, 2010, www.WhosWhoinBlackCanada.com was officially launched.

On January 15, 2015 The website was converted to a platform highlighting black excellence and re-branded as Black In Canada

The website

Purpose
 Canada's leading source on African Canadian Excellence.
 Tell the stories of success, achievement and excellence in the African Canadian experience 
 To shift thinking about how African-Canadians are perceived
 Educate and inspire African-Canadian communities and others
 Document African-Canadian successes and history

Who's Who in Black Canada uses excellence as a benchmark for its selection criteria. Other areas that guide the choices of who is profiled are community involvement, consistency of results, academic background, other awards, and achievements in a specific field.

Publications

See also
 List of black Canadians

References

External links
 

Canadian biographical dictionaries
 Who's Who